Sawani is a genre of semi-classical singing, popular in Uttar Pradesh and Bihar.

It comes in the series of season songs, like Chaiti, Hori and Kajari, and is traditionally sung in the villages and towns of Uttar Pradesh: around Banaras, Mirzapur, Mathura, Allahabad and the Bhojpur regions of Bihar.

References

Indian styles of music
Hindustani music genres
Uttar Pradesh folklore
Culture of Bihar
Hindustani music terminology

hi:कजरी